Lynda Goodfriend is an American actress who is best known for playing Lori Beth Cunningham (née Allen), Richie's girlfriend then wife on the TV sitcom Happy Days.

Early life and education
Goodfriend graduated from Coral Gables High School in Coral Gables, Florida and from Southern Methodist University in Dallas, where she received a degree in drama.

Career
Before Happy Days, Goodfriend played Ethel "Sunshine" Akalino on the short-lived series Blansky's Beauties. After that show left the air, she and co-star Scott Baio joined Happy Days. She originally played a guest role in the fourth season of Happy Days as Kim in "Time Capsule" and "Graduation (Part 1)", before returning to the show as Lori Beth in season five.

Goodfriend went on to play several parts in notable Garry Marshall films, playing a tourist in Pretty Woman as well as cameo and guest star roles in Exit to Eden, Nothing in Common and Beaches. During the mid to late 1980s, Goodfriend appeared in several independent projects, including An All Consuming Passion, a film written and directed by Kathryn Nesmith. Goodfriend directed the teleplay pilot Four Stars that was financed by Garry Marshall and starred veteran actor Bert Kramer and actress Julie Paris. Most recently, she directed the short film The Perfect Crime in 2009.

On Broadway, Goodfriend performed in Good News (1974).

Personal life 
Goodfriend married Giora Litwak in 1982.  She holds a BFA from Southern Methodist University and is the acting chair at the New York Film Academy.

Filmography

References

External links

 In teaching, 'to see this wonderful, exciting person emerge is very satisfying.'
 New York Film Academy Highlights Acting Chair Lynda Goodfriend
 Acting Chair Lynda Goodfriend Speaks at NYFA Australia Campuses

1953 births
Living people
Actresses from Miami
American television actresses
American film actresses
Southern Methodist University alumni
21st-century American women